Command and Control: Nuclear Weapons, the Damascus Accident, and the Illusion of Safety is a 2013 nonfiction book by Eric Schlosser about the history of nuclear weapons systems and accidents involving nuclear weapons in the United States. Incidents Schlosser discusses in the book include the 1980 Damascus Titan missile explosion, the 1966 Palomares B-52 crash, and the 1961 Goldsboro B-52 crash. It was a finalist for the 2014 Pulitzer Prize for History. A documentary film based on the book aired as an episode of American Experience on PBS in early 2017.

Critical reception
A review in The New York Times described it as a "disquieting but riveting" book and Schlosser as a "better reporter than policy analyst".

Speaking of the book, domestic security adviser Lee H. Hamilton said, "The lesson of this powerful and disturbing book is that the world's nuclear arsenals are not as safe as they should be. We should take no comfort in our skill and good fortune in preventing a nuclear catastrophe, but urgently extend our maximum effort to assure that a nuclear weapon does not go off by accident, mistake, or miscalculation."

References

External links

Interview with Schlosser on Command and Control, September 27, 2013, After Words, C-SPAN

See also

List of military nuclear accidents
List of accidents and incidents involving military aircraft
Lists of nuclear disasters and radioactive incidents
Radiation
United States military nuclear incident terminology

2013 non-fiction books
Penguin Press books
Books about nuclear issues
Books by Eric Schlosser
Books about Arkansas
Van Buren County, Arkansas